Cats and Dogs or Cats & Dogs may refer to: cats and dogs

Film
 Cats and Dogs, 1932 Walter Lantz short film
 Cats and Dogs (1952 film), a 1952 Italian comedy film
 Cat and Dog (or Cats and Dogs), 1983 Italian comedy film
 Cats & Dogs film series:
 Cats & Dogs, 2001 Australian-American comedy film
 Cats & Dogs: The Revenge of Kitty Galore, 2010 sequel
 Cats & Dogs 3: Paws Unite!, 2020 sequel

Television 

 Dog and Cat, a 1977 American television series
 Dog X Cat, a 2007–2010 Japanese manga
 Pound Puppies and Kennel Kittens, a 2010-2013 Canadian television series
 CatDog, a 1998-2005 American television series

Music
 Cats & Dogs (Evidence album), 2011
 Cats & Dogs (Mental As Anything album), 1981
 Cats and Dogs (Royal Trux album), a 1993 rock album
 Cats and Dogs (Talisman album), a 2003 hard rock album

Other uses 
 Cats and Dogs (game), a two-player abstract strategy board game
 The Sims 4: Cats & Dogs, a 2017 expansion pack for the video game The Sims 4
 Dribble and Spitz, a video game Warioware (series)

See also
Cat–dog relationship
"Raining cats and dogs", an English idiom to describe an especially heavy rain